Petz (Dogz and Catz) is a series of single-player video games dating back to 1995, in which the player can adopt, raise, care for and breed their own virtual pets. The original Petz has sold over 1.5 million copies worldwide and the brand has grown to over 22 million copies since coming under Ubisoft.

The original Petz games were developed by P.F. Magic. After earning revenues of $8 million in 1997, P.F. Magic was acquired by The Learning Company for $15.8 million in 1998. In 2001, Ubi Soft (since 2003 Ubisoft) acquired the entertainment division of The Learning Company, granting Ubisoft exclusive publishing rights to 88 titles, including Dogz and Catz. After Ubisoft acquired the series, some games that were actually Japanese in origin were localized under the Petz name. For example, Petz: Hamsterz Life 2 on Game Boy Advance is a localization of Hamster Club 3, and distinctly different from its DS counterpart, although both DS Hamsterz games were also Japanese-developed but published in English territories by Ubisoft.

Gameplay
The player starts at the Adoption Center, where they may choose a Dogz or Catz to adopt of a Breedz and gender of their choice. Once the player has found a Petz, they can adopt and name their new Puppyz or Kittenz. After around three days (real time) the Petz become adults. Adult Petz can then breed and have Kittenz or Puppyz of their own in Petz 3, Petz 4, and Petz 5. Cross-breeding can create different types of petz, called 'Mixed Breeds'.

There are a number of Toyz, food and water bowls, and Treatz available. Petz can learn tricks with positive rewards such as petting and Treatz, or trained not to do something using the punishment (water) spray bottle. Petz must be looked after properly; abused or neglected Petz may run away.

Players may share their Petz with others who have the game via an email. Each version allows the importing of Petz from all earlier versions. There is also a camera feature, permitting snapshots of Petz to be taken and saved as .bmp files.

Other animals include Pigz and Bunnyz.  Later versions of the games included a Petz Web Fun Pack, Petz Publisher and a Petz Player web browser plug-in, allowing players to publish their Petz online in playable webpages. The Petz Publisher does not work anymore, due to the fact that the website has been remodeled with the newer Petz games by Ubisoft.

Users learned how to reverse-engineer the system, and began producing additional Breedz, Toyz, playscenes, clothes, and developer tools for the games, as permitted by PF Magic, Mindscape, and Ubisoft.

Development
Rob Fulop developed the first title in the series, Dogz: Your Computer Pet, following the controversy surrounding his previous title Night Trap and with the desire to make a game that was "so cute and so adorable that no could ever, ever say it was bad for kids". He claims to have consulted a shopping mall Santa Claus to understand "exactly what kids wanted" who informed him that puppies were a popular gift request every single year, leading to the idea of a virtual puppy.

Main series

Reception
Entertainment Weekly gave Catz a B+ and wrote that it is an accurate simulation of felines.

The Petz series is also notable for the online community that grew around it, which game designer Nathalie Lawhead speculates is part of the reason for its success and enduring legacy.

See also

 Babyz
 Hamsterz Life
 Horsez
 Nintendogs
 Oddballz
 Tamagotchi
 Petz: Dogz 2 and Catz 2

References

Academic papers
 Socially Intelligent Virtual Petz
 Creating Emotional Relationships with Virtual Characters
 Virtual Babyz: Believable Agents with Narrative Intelligence

Classic Mac OS games
N-Gage service games
PF Magic games
Ubisoft franchises
Ubisoft games
Video game franchises
Video game franchises introduced in 1995
Video games developed in the United States
Virtual pet video games
Windows games
Single-player video games
Mindscape games